Lema daturaphila, commonly known as the three-lined potato beetle, is a species of beetle in the family Chrysomelidae. It is originally from Central and North America, but has spread elsewhere.

Description
Adult L. daturaphila measure 7-8 mmm in length and a bright orange-yellow in colour. Their elytra are marked with dark lines, one at either side and one along the suture between the wings. It is from this feature that their common name derives. The larvae are slug-like with black heads.

Diet and behaviour
Three-lined potato beetles are found on plants in the family Solanaceae and are often agricultural pests to crops. They are commonly found on tomatillo (Physalis ixocarpa), which they can severely damage. They also feed on tomato and potato plants, but far less frequently.  They can also infest sacred datura. The larvae hatch in late June or July, feed on their host plant, and are often found in groups. The larvae cover themselves with their own excrement, probably as a natural defence against predation.

Similar species 
L. daturaphila is similar in appearance to Lema trivittata and Lema bilineata, which are all closely related.

References

Beetles described in 1970
Criocerinae
Agricultural pest insects
Beetles of North America